The Little Drummer Boy is a stop motion television special produced by Rankin/Bass Productions, based on the song of the same name. It was first televised in Canada on December 19, 1968 on the CTV Television Network, followed four days later by its American nationwide release on NBC. A sequel was broadcast in 1976.

Plot

A young Jewish boy named Aaron lives a peaceful and happy life with his parents on a farm with their three farm animals, Samson the Donkey, Baba the Lamb, and Joshua the Camel. On his birthday, Aaron's parents give him a drum as a gift, to which the animals dance when he plays it. One night, bandits from the desert steal their livestock, kill Aaron's parents, and burn the farm down. Emotionally scarred from the tragedy, Aaron begins to hate all humanity. Because his drumming can make the three animals dance, Aaron is kidnapped and forced to join Ben Haramed's caravan with rather inept performers against his will. When performing in Jerusalem, Aaron becomes infuriated by the townspeople's amusement and lashes out at them for being thieves and knaves.

Some time later, the troupe comes upon the Magi caravan who are following a bright star in the sky. Seizing his chance, Ben greedily attempts to perform for the Magi, but they are uninterested as they try to make haste to get to the star's destination. One of the caravan camels becomes too weak to continue traveling and the Magi has no extra camel, so Ben seizes Aaron and bargains with them that they use Joshua in exchange for some of their gold, but Aaron refuses to take any gold from Ben and leaves for Bethlehem with Samson and Baba. Later Aaron and his two remaining animal companions Samson and Baba escape, climb the tallest hill and join up with the Magi as they follow the star and then journey toward Bethlehem. There, upon recognizing Joshua and trying to reunite with him, Baba is struck by a Roman chariot. Aaron takes the injured lamb to the Magi to be healed, but they insist that maybe the baby can help. Having no gift to give to the baby, Aaron decides that his "gift" to Him and His parents will be his playing his drum for them. As a sign of gratitude, Baba is healed and rushes into Aaron's arms, filling Aaron's heart with joy at last.

Voice cast
 Greer Garson as "Our Storyteller"
 Teddy Eccles as Aaron
 Jose Ferrer as Ben Haramad
 Paul Frees as Ali, Aaron's father, Three Kings
 June Foray as Aaron's mother
 The Vienna Boys' Choir singing the title song.

Reception
The Little Drummer Boy received an approval rating of 75% on review aggregator website Rotten Tomatoes, based on thirteen reviews. The site's critical consensus reads: "The Little Drummer Boy is a mature addition to the Rankin-Bass catalogue, with a powerful conclusion that compensates for the special's dour storytelling and unpolished animation."

1976 sequel
In 1976, Rankin/Bass produced a sequel, titled The Little Drummer Boy, Book II, again sponsored by the American Gas Association. It premiered on December 13, 1976 on NBC, and like its predecessor, has also aired on Freeform and separately on AMC as of 2018. Warner Bros. is the show's current distributor through their ownership of the post-1973 Rankin/Bass Productions library via Telepictures. In this sequel, written by Jules Bass (under the pseudonym Julian P. Gardner), Aaron and his animal friends team up with Melchior, one of the Magi, to protect silver bells, made to ring for Christ's arrival, from a band of greedy Roman soldiers. Warner Archive released The Little Drummer Boy Book II, in a collection called Rankin/Bass TV Holiday Favorites Collection.

Voice cast
 Greer Garson as Our Storyteller
 Zero Mostel as Brutus
 David Jay as Aaron
 Bob McFadden as Plato
 Ray Owens as Melchior
 Allen Swift as Simeon and The Soldiers

See also
List of Rankin/Bass Productions films
List of Christmas films

References

External links 

1968 animated films
1968 television specials
1976 animated films
1976 films
1976 television specials
1960s American animated films
1960s American television specials
1960s animated short films
1970s American animated films
1970s American television specials
1970s animated short films
American children's animated films
Animated films about orphans
1960s animated television specials
1970s animated television specials
Christmas television specials
Films about the Nativity of Jesus
Films based on multiple works
Films based on songs
Films scored by Maury Laws
Television shows directed by Arthur Rankin Jr.
Television shows directed by Jules Bass
NBC television specials
Rankin/Bass Productions television specials
Stop-motion animated television shows
Stop-motion animated short films
Cultural depictions of the Biblical Magi
Television shows written by Romeo Muller
American Christmas television specials
Animated Christmas television specials